Ranchi Sadar subdivision is an administrative subdivision in the Ranchi district of the South Chotanagpur division in the state of Jharkhand, India.

Overview
Ranchi district is a part of the Ranchi plateau, most of it at an average elevation of 2,140 feet above sea level. Only a small portion in the north-eastern part of the district is the lower Ranchi plateau, spread over Silli, Rahe, Sonahatu and Tamar CD blocks, at an elevation of 500 to 1,000 feet above sea level. There is a 16 km long ridge south-west of Ranchi. There are isolated hills in the central plateau.

Administrative divisions

Ranchi district is divided into two sub-divisions:Ranchi Sadar subdivision and Bundu subdivision.Ranchi Sadar subdivision consists of 14 CD blocks: Kanke, Ratu, Chanho, Mandar, Lapung, Burmu, Bero, Namkum, Ormanjhi, Angara, Silli, Khelari, Nagri and Itki. Bundu subdivision consists of 4 CD blocks: Rahe, Bundu, Sonahatu and Tamar. The details of the CD blocks are given below for the respective subdivision.

There are two statutory towns in the district - Ranchi is a municipal corporation housing the headquarters of Ranchi Sadar subdivision, and Bundu is a nagar panchayat, housing the headquarters of Bundu subdivision. There are thirteen census towns in Ranchi district, all are in Ranchi Sadar subdivision: Bisrampur, Churi, Ray, Khelari, Kanke, Arsande, Ibra, Muri, Tati, Ara, Bargarwa, Ratu and Tundul.

Police stations
The following police stations are located in Ranchi Sadar subdivision: Argora, Bariatu, Chutia, Daily Market, Gonda, Hindpiri, Jagannathpur, Kotwali, Lalpur, Lower Bazar, Pundag, Sadar, SC/ ST, Sukdeonagar, Airport and Khelgaon (all in/ around Ranchi city). Angara, Bero, Burmu, Chanho, Itki, Kanke, Khelari, Lapung, Mandar, Nagri, Namkum, Narkopi, Pithoria, Ratu, Sikidiri, Silli, Tatisilwai (all in the CD blocks). There is a police outpost at Muri.

Blocks
Community development blocks in Ranchi Sadar subdivision are:

Education

Educational institutions
The following institutions are located in Ranchi Sadar subdivision:
Ranchi University was established in 1960 as a teaching-cum-affiliating university at Ranchi.
 Central Institute of Psychiatry was established at Kanke in 1918.
 Indian Institute of Natural Resins and Gums (formerly Indian Lac Research Institute), under ICAR, was established in 1924 at Namkum. 
 Birla Institute of Technology was established in 1955 at Mesra.
 National Institute of Foundry and Forge Technology (renamed National Institute of Advanced Manufacturing Technology) was established in 1966 at Hatia.
 Jharkhand University of Technology was established in 2015 at Namkum.
 Birsa Agricultural University was established in 1981 at Kanke.
 Dr. Shyama Prasad Mukherjee University was established at Ranchi in 2017.
 National University of Study and Research in Law was established in 2010 at Ranchi.
 Jharkhand Raksha Shakti University was established in 2015 at Ranchi.
 Central University of Jharkhand was established at Ranchi in 2009.
 Rajendra Institute of Medical Sciences was established in 2002 at Ranchi. 
 Ranchi Institute of Neuropsychiatry and Allied Sciences was established in 1998 at Ranchi. 
 St. Xavier's College, Ranchi was established in 1958 at Ranchi. 
 Gossner College was established in 1971 at Ranchi.
 Yogoda Satsanga Mahavidyalaya was established in 1971 at Ranchi.
 Maulana Azad College was established in 1960 at Ranchi.
 Nirmala College, Ranchi was established in 1969 at Ranchi.
 Sanjay Gandhi Memorial College was established in 1980 at Ranchi.
 St. Paul's College, Ranchi was established in 1980 at Ranchi.
 Kartik Oraon College at Ratu.
 Uttari Karnpura Shramik Mahavidyalaya was established at Dakra in 1990.
 Silli College was established in 1980 at Silli.

Nursing Colleges
 Florence College of Nursing was established at Irba in 2003–04.
 Shine – Abdur Razzaque Ansari Institute of Health Education & Research was established in 2009 at Irba.
 Amrita College of Nursing was established at Hutup, PO Irba.
 Kingpin College of Nursing was established in 2019 at Angara.
  St. Barnabas Hospital College of Nursing was established in 2015 at Ranchi.

B.Ed. Colleges
 Government Teachers Training College was established in 1955 at Ranchi.
 Shaswat Institute of Teacher's Education was established at Hutup, PO Irba.
 Sanghamitra Teacher Training College, was established at Chutupalu.
 J.D. National B.Ed. College was established at Janum, PO Angara.
 Jaipuria B Ed College was established at Bisa, PO Getalsud, Angara, in 2012.
 Cambridge Institute of Teachers Education was established at Baheya, PO Angara.
 Shaheed Sheikh Bhikari College of Education at Sutiyambe, Pithuriya, was established in 2012.

(Information about degree colleges with proper reference may be added here)

Healthcare

Medical facilities
The following medical facilities are available in Ranchi Sadar subdivision:
 Rajendra Institute of Medical Sciences was established in 2002 at Ranchi. 
 Central Institute of Psychiatry was established at Ranchi in 1918.
 Abdur Razzaque Ansari Memorial Weavers Hospital (Apollo Hospital Group) was established in 1996 at Irba.
 Itki TB Sanatorium at Itki is proposed to be converted to a multi-speciality hospital.

(Anybody having referenced information about location of government/ private medical facilities may please add it here)

References

Sub-divisions in Jharkhand